Miloš Lačný (born 8 March 1988) is a Slovak footballer who plays as a forward for FC Košice.

Career
Lačný signed professional terms with Ružomberok in 2007, having spent the previous four years as a youth player and went on to score 16 goals in just under 50 league appearances. His form saw him go on trial to Scottish Premier League side Celtic Glasgow in December 2009 but he signed a three-year contract with Sparta Prague in January 2010. Eighteen months later, in July 2011 and after just 15 league appearances for Sparta, Lačný returned to Celtic on trial. With no move materialising, he joined ŠK Slovan Bratislava in August 2011 on a six-month loan.

In January 2012, after his loan deal expired, Lačný returned to Scotland for a third time, this time on trial with Dundee United. and clinched a year-long loan move. He made his debut against Rangers in a fifth round clash of the Scottish Cup at Ibrox which Dundee United won 2-0. He scored his first goal for Dundee United in a 5-1 win against St Johnstone on 11 February 2012.

In February 2014, Lačný signed a three-year contract with Kazakhstan Premier League side Kairat Almaty.

In January 2015, Lačný signed for Ekstraklasa side Śląsk Wrocław on a six-month contract, with the option of another two-years. However, the contract extension was not exercised and he returned to Slovakian side Ružomberok in September 2015.

In September 2017, he joined Žilina, before joining Georgian side Torpedo Kutaisi the following summer on a one-year contract. In February 2019, he returned to Slovakia, joining Sereď on a six-month contract.

He joined South African Premier Division side AmaZulu on an 18-month contract in January 2020.

Following his South African spell, he featured in Sereď under Gergely Geri. In the summer of 2021, the manager had signed with Pohronie and Lačný followed suit, becoming Pohronie's first signing in the transfer seasons.

References

External links
 Sparta Prague profile 
 

1988 births
Living people
People from Levoča
Sportspeople from the Prešov Region
Slovak footballers
Slovak expatriate footballers
Slovakia youth international footballers
Slovakia under-21 international footballers
Association football forwards
MFK Ružomberok players
ŠK Slovan Bratislava players
AC Sparta Prague players
Dundee United F.C. players
FC Neman Grodno players
FC Kairat players
Śląsk Wrocław players
MŠK Žilina players
FC Torpedo Kutaisi players
AmaZulu F.C. players
ŠKF Sereď players
FK Pohronie players
PDRM FA players
FC Košice (2018) players
Scottish Premier League players
Slovak Super Liga players
2. Liga (Slovakia)  players
Czech First League players
Czech National Football League players
Ekstraklasa players
Erovnuli Liga players
Belarusian Premier League players
Kazakhstan Premier League players
South African Premier Division players
Expatriate footballers in the Czech Republic
Expatriate footballers in Belarus
Expatriate footballers in Scotland
Expatriate footballers in Kazakhstan
Expatriate footballers in Poland
Expatriate footballers in Georgia (country)
Expatriate soccer players in South Africa
Expatriate footballers in Malaysia
Slovak expatriate sportspeople in the Czech Republic
Slovak expatriate sportspeople in Belarus
Slovak expatriate sportspeople in Scotland
Slovak expatriate sportspeople in Kazakhstan
Slovak expatriate sportspeople in Poland
Slovak expatriate sportspeople in Georgia (country)